San Guillermo (Spanish for Saint William), officially the Municipality of San Guillermo, is a 4th class municipality in the province of Isabela, Philippines. According to the 2020 census, it has a population of 20,915 people.

Etymology
The town was named after Eugenio Guillermo, in honor of the former mayor of Angadanan.

History
On June 17, 1967, the municipality of San Guillermo was created by virtue of Republic Act No. 4906, sponsored by Melanio Singson, the then-representative of Isabela's lone district. San Guillermo was named in honor of Eugenio Guillermo, the then-mayor of Angadanan. It took 15 barangays from Angadanan (i.e. Anonang, Colorado, Calaoagan, Dipacamo, Peredo Edcor, Guam, Nakar, Palawan, Progreso, San Francisco Norte, San Mariano Norte, San Mariano Sur, Villa Rose, Villa Sanchez, and Villa Teresita) and 4 from Echague (i.e. Aringay, Dingading, San Francisco Sur and Sinalugan).

Due to noticeable increase in number of population migration and the potential economic growth, additional barangays were created during the term of Mayor Alvaro Filart, such as barangays Burgos, Dietban, Estrella, Rizal, San Rafael and Villa Remedios. Subsequently, barangay Peredo Edcor was split into two barangays, namely: Centro 1 and Centro 2, which is now the poblacion and the municipality's official seat.

Geography

Barangays
San Guillermo is politically subdivided into barangays. These barangays are headed by elected officials: Barangay Captain, Barangay Council, whose members are called Barangay Councilors. All are elected every three years.

Climate

Demographics

Economy

Government

Local government
The municipality is governed by a mayor designated as its local chief executive and by a municipal council as its legislative body in accordance with the Local Government Code. The mayor, vice mayor, and the councilors are elected directly by the people through an election which is being held every three years.

Elected officials

Congress representation
San Guillermo, belonging to the sixth legislative district of the province of Isabela, currently represented by Hon. Faustino A. Dy V.

Education
The Schools Division of Isabela governs the town's public education system. The division office is a field office of the DepEd in Cagayan Valley region. The office governs the public and private elementary and public and private high schools throughout the municipality.

References

External links
Municipal Profile at the National Competitiveness Council of the Philippines
San Guillermo at the Isabela Government Website
Local Governance Performance Management System
[ Philippine Standard Geographic Code]
Philippine Census Information
Municipality of San Guillermo

Municipalities of Isabela (province)